The Jackson Heights–Roosevelt Avenue/74th Street station is a New York City Subway station complex served by the IRT Flushing Line and the IND Queens Boulevard Line. Located at the triangle of 74th Street, Broadway, and Roosevelt Avenue in Jackson Heights, Queens, it is served by the:

 7, E, and F trains at all times
 R train at all times except late nights
 M train weekdays except late nights
 <F> train during rush hours in the reverse peak direction

In , it was the second-busiest subway station in Queens and the  busiest subway station in the system.

History

IRT station 

The 1913 Dual Contracts called for the Interborough Rapid Transit Company (IRT) and Brooklyn Rapid Transit Company (BRT; later Brooklyn–Manhattan Transit Corporation, or BMT) to build new lines in Brooklyn, Queens, and the Bronx. Queens did not receive many new IRT and BRT lines compared to Brooklyn and the Bronx, since the city's Public Service Commission (PSC) wanted to alleviate subway crowding in the other two boroughs first before building in Queens, which was relatively undeveloped. The IRT Flushing Line was to be one of two Dual Contracts lines in the borough, along with the Astoria Line; it would connect Flushing and Long Island City, two of Queens' oldest settlements, to Manhattan via the Steinway Tunnel. When the majority of the line was built in the early 1910s, most of the route went through undeveloped land, and Roosevelt Avenue had not been constructed. Community leaders advocated for more Dual Contracts lines to be built in Queens to allow development there. The 74th Street station opened on April 21, 1917, as part of an extension of the line from Queensboro Plaza to 103rd Street–Corona Plaza. At the time, the station was known as Broadway. The IRT agreed to operate the line under the condition that any loss of profits would be repaid by the city. 

In 1923, the BMT started operating shuttle services along the Flushing Line, which terminated at Queensboro Plaza.  The city government took over the IRT's operations on June 12, 1940. The IRT routes were given numbered designations in 1948 with the introduction of "R-type" rolling stock, which contained rollsigns with numbered designations for each service. The route from Times Square to Flushing became known as the 7. On October 17, 1949, the joint BMT/IRT operation of the Flushing Line ended, and the line became the responsibility of the IRT. After the end of BMT/IRT dual service, the New York City Board of Transportation announced that the Flushing Line platforms would be lengthened to 11 IRT car lengths; the platforms were only able to fit nine 51-foot-long IRT cars beforehand. The platforms at the 74th Street station were extended in 1955–1956 to accommodate 11-car trains. However, nine-car trains continued to run on the 7 route until 1962, when they were extended to ten cars. With the opening of the 1964 New York World's Fair, trains were lengthened to eleven cars.

IND station 
The Queens Boulevard Line was one of the first built by the city-owned Independent Subway System (IND), and was planned to stretch between the IND Eighth Avenue Line in Manhattan and 178th Street and Hillside Avenue in Jamaica, Queens, with a stop at Roosevelt Avenue. The line was first proposed in 1925. Construction of the line was approved by the New York City Board of Estimate on October 4, 1928. As planned, Roosevelt Avenue was to be one of the Queens Boulevard Line's five express stops, as well as one of 22 total stops on the line between Seventh Avenue in Manhattan and 178th Street in Queens. The line was constructed using the cut-and-cover tunneling method, and to allow pedestrians to cross, temporary bridges were built over the trenches.

The Roosevelt Avenue station opened on August 19, 1933, as the terminus of the first section of the line, which stretched from the connection to the Eighth Avenue Line at 50th Street. Upon the opening of the Queens Boulevard Line station at Roosevelt Avenue, a transfer to and from the Flushing Line station at Broadway was implemented. The station was the Queens Boulevard Line's terminus from 1933 until an extension east to Union Turnpike opened on December 31, 1936. An uncompleted upper level station was also built along with the completed lower level station. The construction of the new Roosevelt Avenue complex led to increased demand for housing in the area. It also inspired plans for a proposed shopping mall nearby, which was ultimately not built.

The Victor Moore Arcade, a streamlined local landmark where passengers could transfer from the new IND subway to buses for distant neighborhoods and for LaGuardia Airport, officially opened on December 11, 1941. The two-story bus terminal and arcade, located at the triangle formed by Broadway, Roosevelt Avenue, and 75th Street, also featured a shopping area. The structure was named after Victor Moore, a notable Broadway actor and Freeport resident who had appealed to build a bus terminal in his name along Broadway and near the station. It served as a hub for the operations of Triboro Coach.

On May 2, 1970, an out-of-service  train collided with another GG train in revenue service on the Queens Boulevard Line. The revenue-service train was switching from the southbound express track to the local track (it had been rerouted around the out-of-service train). Two people died and 71 were injured in the worst subway collision since the 1928 Times Square derailment. Following the 1970 accident, New York Magazine highlighted the state of the subway system in a lengthy exposé, in which it concluded that the subway's condition was getting worse compared to previous years.

Station complex 
In August 1951, the New York City Board of Transportation approved the installation of six elevators at the Roosevelt Avenue/74th Street station. The $965,000 contract called for one escalator between the IND mezzanine and either of the IND platforms; two escalators between the IND and IRT mezzanines; and one escalator between the IRT mezzanine and either of the IRT platforms. In 1956, the New York City Transit Authority announced that it would open a request for proposal for additional escalators between the IRT and IND stations. At the time, the station had six exits, but only one token booth in the IND mezzanine, which led to severe congestion during rush hours.

The Metropolitan Transportation Authority (MTA) announced in 2000 that it would demolish the Victor Moore Arcade as part of a proposed renovation of the station complex; all of the arcade's merchants had moved out by May 2000. Advocacy group Straphangers Campaign had conducted a poll the same year, in which riders ranked Jackson Heights–Roosevelt Avenue/74th Street station as the dirtiest among the city's 15 busiest stations. The MTA began restoring the bus terminal in early May 2001. The MTA approved a renovation of the station itself in September 2002; at the time, the project was slated to cost $87 million. The project prompted complaints from merchants, who alleged that the construction damaged their stores and drove away customers. 

The Flushing Line platforms and the bus terminal were completely rebuilt, and the Queens Boulevard Line platforms were refurbished by construction firm Skanska at a total cost of $132 million. Elevators were also added during this project. As part of the renovation, the MTA had removed the complex's payphones in April 2005. The agency agreed to restore the payphones after a request from state senator John Sabini, who said a woman had died at the station because the lack of phones made it hard to contact paramedics. The new station building was completed in 2005 to a design by Stantec. The Jackson Heights bus terminal opened on July 13, 2005.

Station layout

The station complex consists of two separate stations, connected by escalators, stairs, and elevators. The main entrance, a station building bounded by Roosevelt Avenue, 75th Street, Broadway, and 74th Street, includes the Victor A. Moore Bus Terminal. The new station building is one of the first green buildings in the MTA system, which is partially powered by solar panels on the roof of the station building and above the IRT platform. The solar panels were added following the success of a similar project at the Coney Island–Stillwell Avenue station. The building is made of recycled material such as concrete consisted of 15% fly ash and steel that was prefabricated; in addition, the builders recycled 86% of the waste materials. The station building also contains some retail space at the corner of 75th Street and Broadway, and also leases a few other spaces between the fare control area and the bus terminal. Four elevators make the entire station complex ADA-accessible.

Two stairs and an elevator from each of the Flushing Line platforms, lead down to an above-ground landing, whereupon a set of stairs leads to the main station house, which also contains the station agent booth. The Flushing-bound platform's elevator leads from the Flushing-bound platform to the aboveground landing, then to the street level fare control, and finally to a landing between the street level and the belowground Queens Boulevard Line mezzanine. The full-time station agent booth, and two banks of turnstiles for fare control, are located in this station house at street level. Two escalators also lead directly from the Flushing Line landing to the Queens Boulevard Line mezzanine. From the mezzanine, various stairs lead down to each of the Queens Boulevard Line platforms, and an elevator from the belowground landing leads to the mezzanine and the Manhattan-bound platform. There is another elevator from the Forest Hills- and Jamaica-bound platform to the mezzanine. There are also some stores and an ATM lining the mezzanine within fare control. In total, the station has  of storefront space.

The 2004 artwork in the station house is called Passage by Tom Patti, and was designed in conjunction with FX+FOWLE Architects. The artwork consisted of trapezoid-shaped laminated glass panels located on the upper part of the building's eastern facade. The glass panels break up light into different colors, depending on the vantage point.

Alternate exits
At 73rd Street and Broadway, on the north side of Roosevelt Avenue, a set of stairs from each of the IRT Flushing Line platforms lead down to a landing below the elevated structure. There is a connection to the Queens Boulevard Line mezzanine via three long, narrow escalators, where there are exits from the below-ground fare control points.

Exits from the underground mezzanine lead to the station building; the northeast corner of 73rd Street, 37th Road, and Broadway; the southwest corner of Broadway and 74th Street; and both eastern corners of Broadway and 75th Street. The only direct exit from the Flushing Line platforms is from the 74th Street mezzanine, which leads to the station building, with an additional side exit to the northeast corner of Roosevelt Avenue and 74th Street.

IRT Flushing Line platforms 

The 74th Street–Broadway station (originally Broadway station) on the IRT Flushing Line is a local station that has three tracks and two side platforms. The center track is used by the rush hour peak direction <7> express service, but trains do not stop here, although there are track switches at either side to let express trains stop there in case of emergency or to allow transfers when work on a local track forces trains to run express.

The station has two fare control areas at 73rd Street and two at 74th. The 74th Street mezzanine has a wooden floor with windscreens on the stairs, a booth, and a crossunder, with stairs to both the new station building and to the northeast corner of 74th Street and Roosevelt Avenue. The 73rd Street mezzanine contains wooden stair walls, no windows, and no booth (the booth being in the IND entrance at street level). The canopy at the west end is different, having been added later than the original canopy.

IND Queens Boulevard Line platforms 

The Jackson Heights–Roosevelt Avenue station (signed as Roosevelt Avenue–Jackson Heights on overhead signs) is an express station on the IND Queens Boulevard Line that has four tracks and two narrow island platforms. The express tracks are served by the E train at all times except nights, and F trains at all times. The local tracks are served by the M train on weekdays, the R train at all times except late nights, and the E train during late nights.

The outer track walls have a midnight blue trim line with a black border and 2-by-10-tile white-on-black tile captions reading "ROOSEVELT" in Helvetica at regular intervals. These were installed in the renovation, and replace the original Cerulean blue trim line and 1-tile-high captions in the original IND font. The platforms' I-beam columns are painted blue, but some columns are encased in concrete and covered with white tiles. The fare control is in the center of the full-length mezzanine above the platforms and tracks, with unmanned High Entry-Exit Turnstile (HEET) entrances at the southeast end of the mezzanine, and a turnstiled exit with a booth at the northeast end. There is also a HEET entrance in the center of the mezzanine.

West of the station, there are switches between both westbound tracks; the corresponding switches for the eastbound tracks are east of the station. On both sides, there are also switches between both express tracks.

Unused upper level 

Along the ramp leading to the southeastern fare control, there is an unused and uncompleted Roosevelt Avenue terminal station for the IND Second System directly above the Manhattan-bound platform. This terminal has an island platform with a trackway on each side. There are no rails in the trackbeds, but tiles depicting the station name on the tile walls are present. The signs hanging over the platform, however, are blank. East of the station lies a long, dark section of a 3-block-long tunnel with provisions for a crossover and a ramp down to the Manhattan-bound local track of the active mainline below. Along these trackways, trains from the lower level tracks can be seen. The platform itself has been converted to offices and storage.

There is a trackway just east of Roosevelt Avenue that diverges away from the Manhattan-bound local track. The trackway ramps up to the same level as the two trackways coming from the never-used Roosevelt Avenue Terminal, making three trackways on the upper level. The ramp flies over the mainline tracks along with the two other trackways. Between 78th and 79th Streets, the three trackways on upper level curve towards the south and ending at the wall at the edge of constructed subway. There is a diverging bellmouth next to the Jamaica-bound local track several hundred feet north of the station just at the location where the three upstairs trackways are crossing over. This bellmouth also curves towards the south and similarly ends on a concrete wall shortly after the start of the bellmouth. At the end of the unused tunnel there is an emergency exit that opens out to the south side of Broadway across the street from Elmhurst Hospital Center. The four-track subway running south was a plan for a line along the Long Island Rail Road right-of-way to Garfield Avenue and 65th Place. The line, called the Winfield Spur, would have turned along 65th Place to Fresh Pond Road and then along Fresh Pond Road to Cypress Hills Street. The line would have merged with the Myrtle–Central Avenues Line to the Rockaways proposed in 1929. All four trackways end at a concrete wall where they begin to diverge from the excavation for the existing line.

East of this station, next to the southbound track, the bellmouth with the ramp ascending to the upper level once had a layup track on it. On the Roosevelt Avenue interlocking machine in the station tower, there are spare levers for the necessary signals and switches. On the southbound local track, there is a homeball signal, "D1-1415", which has the lower portion lenses covered over and now functions as an automatic signal. The interlocking machine still shows evidence of the now-nonexistent interlocking where the Winfield spur was to have turned off from the D1 track and the D2 track.

Victor A. Moore Bus Terminal 

The Victor A. Moore Bus Terminal, which replaces the earlier building known as the Victor Moore Arcade, is located within the station building at Broadway and 74th Street. It is named after actor Victor Moore, who had funded the construction of the original arcade after winning a wager. The terminal serve six bus routes. Lanes 1 through 3, which serve three of these bus routes, are located inside the terminal. Lanes 2 and 3, which serve the Q49 and northbound Q70 SBS buses respectively, can accommodate one bus each, while Lane 1, which serves the Q33, can accommodate two buses. The Q32, Q47, and southbound Q70 SBS buses stop on Roosevelt Avenue, while the Q53 SBS and southbound Q47 stop on Broadway. All buses from the terminal are operated by MTA Bus, successors to the Triboro Coach routes, except the Q32, which is operated by New York City Bus. To accommodate compressed natural gas buses, the rebuilt terminal has a higher roof than the original arcade.

Notes

References

External links 

 
 
 nycsubway.org — Passage Artwork by Tom Patti (2004)
 Station Reporter — 74th Street/Roosevelt Avenue Complex
 Abandoned Stations — Roosevelt Avenue Upper Level
 The Subway Nut — Roosevelt Avenue–Jackson Heights (E,F,M,R) Pictures
 The Subway Nut — 74th Street–Broadway (7) Pictures
 MTA's Arts For Transit — Jackson Heights–Roosevelt Avenue/74th Street–Broadway

IRT Flushing Line stations
IND Queens Boulevard Line stations
New York City Subway transfer stations
New York City Subway stations in Queens, New York
Jackson Heights, Queens
Railway stations in the United States opened in 1917
Railway stations in the United States opened in 1933
1917 establishments in New York City
1933 establishments in New York City